Lira University (LU) is a university in Uganda. It is one of the eleven public universities and degree-awarding institutions in the country.

Location
The coordinates of the university campus are 2°15'04.0"N, 32°49'16.0"E (Latitude:2.251111; Longitude:32.821111).

History
The university first opened in August 2012 with 100 students. At that time, the institution was a constituent college of Gulu University and was known as Gulu University Constituent College Lira. It was also referred to as Lira University College.

In June 2015, the Uganda Ministry of Education elevated the college to university status, effective with the 2016-17 academic year that began in August 2016.

Faculties
As of January 2016, LU maintained the following academic units:
 Faculty of Engineering and Technology
 Faculty of Health Sciences
 Institute of Management Science
 Institute of Medicinal Plants and Biodiversity

Academic courses
As of July 2017, the following undergraduate academic programs were offered:

 Bachelor of Civil Engineering
 Bachelor of Mechanical Engineering
 Bachelor of Electrical Engineering
 Bachelor of Oil and Gas
 Bachelor of Textile Studies
 Bachelor of Computer Science
 Bachelor of Library and Information Technology 
 Bachelor of Survey
 Bachelor of Land Economics
 Bachelor of Technology
 Bachelor of Architecture
 Bachelor of Science in Biomedical Science
 Bachelor of Science in Midwifery
 Bachelor of Science in Public Health
 Bachelor of Food Science and Nutrition
 Bachelor of Dentistry
 Bachelor of Commerce
 Bachelor of Business Studies and Management

See also
 List of university leaders in Uganda
 List of universities in Uganda
 List of business schools in Uganda
 Education in Uganda

References

External links
 Lira University website

Lira District
Lango sub-region
Northern Region, Uganda
2012 establishments in Uganda
Universities and colleges in Uganda
Educational institutions established in 2012
Engineering universities and colleges in Uganda